Laurence John Weatherstone (born 13 March 1950) is a former rugby union player who represented Australia.

Weatherstone, a centre, was born in Bathurst, New South Wales and claimed a total of 7 international rugby caps for Australia.

References

Australian rugby union players
Australia international rugby union players
1950 births
Living people
Rugby union players from New South Wales
Rugby union centres